Peacock in the Park is an annual LGBT variety show, held at Washington Park in  Portland, Oregon, in the United States. The event was founded in 1987 and ran for 18 years, until it was replaced by the Peacock After Dark event in 2005. Due to popular demand, Peacock in the Park returned in 2014. It is considered family-friendly and is free to attend. Shows feature dancers, drag performances, and live music.

Portland Monthly described Peacock in the Park as "Portland's gay equivalent of the Super Bowl: thousands from the queer spectrum flocked to Washington Park's amphitheater, spread out blankets and coolers of beer, and mingled before a stage of drag and music performances".

References

External links

 
 
 Peacock in the Park at the Imperial Sovereign Rose Court of Oregon
 AFTER A DECADE-LONG HIATUS, PEACOCK RETURNS! (June 11, 2014), PQ Monthly
 Fugitives and Refugees 10 Years Later: An Omnibus (July 3, 2013), Willamette Week

1987 establishments in Oregon
Annual events in Portland, Oregon
LGBT culture in Portland, Oregon
Washington Park (Portland, Oregon)